Stubička Slatina is a village located in the municipality of Oroslavje in Krapina-Zagorje County, Croatia.

Demographics 
In the 2011 census, there were 630 inhabitants in Stubička Slatina.

In the census of 2011, the absolute majority were Croats.

References

External links

Populated places in Krapina-Zagorje County